Sam Byibesho (born 25 April 1964) is a Ugandan teacher, public administrator and politician. He is the elected Member of Parliament for Kisoro Municipality and a representative of National Resistance Movement (NRM), the ruling political party in Uganda. He is a member of the Local Government Accounts Committee, the Committee on Public Service and Local Government; and the NRM Parliamentary Caucus in the 10th Parliament of Uganda.

Byibesho formerly served as the mayor of Kisoro Town Council from 2002 up until 2016 when he became a legislator. He is the former head teacher of Mubuga Primary School and previously worked as a Grade III teacher from 1991 to 1996. He is also the NRM chairperson for his constituency, Kisoro Municipality.

Early life and education
Byibesho was born in Kisoro, Kigezi sub-region, on 25 April 1964 in an Anglican family of the Bafumbira. He is the firstborn child of Obed Byibesho, a clergyman, and Aidah Byibesho, a farmer, and had two sisters and two brothers.

He attended Seseme Primary School, St. Paul's Senior Secondary School Mutorere and City High School Kampala for his O-Level education, attaining a UCE certification in 1984.

In 1991, he acquired a Grade 3 Certificate from Kisoro Primary Teachers' College (PTC), before attending Kyambogo University, where he attained a Diploma in Education in the year 2004. Byibesho further advanced to Uganda Martyrs University Nkozi where he was a coordinator for Kisoro Students Association and graduated with a Bachelor of Education in 2009.

Career and politics
Professionally, Byibesho started his career as a Grade III primary school teacher at Seseme Primary School, from 1991 to 1996. He was then promoted to the position of primary school headmaster in 1997 at Mubuga Primary School and served in that capacity up until 2002 when he resigned, as required by law, to serve as LC III Chairperson for Kisoro Town Council.

Politically, he began his career as an RC I chairperson for Karumena Village from 1988 to 1992. He was then elected RC II chairperson for Kisoro Central Parish and concurrently served as a councilor for Kisoro Town Council from 1992 to 1996. In 1997, when Resistance Councils (RCs) were renamed Local Councils (LCs), he continued to serve as an LC II chairperson for North Ward Parish, Kisoro TC Sub-county up until 2002 when he became the LC III Chairman, a position he held for 14 years.

In the later days of his LC III chairmanship, Byibesho bid for the more lucrative position of member of parliament on the NRM ticket and won both the party's 2015 primary elections and the 2016 general elections, thereby becoming a member of the 10th Parliament for the Pearl of Africa, representing Kisoro Municipality, Kisoro District. In the 10th Parliament, Byibesho serves on the Local Government Accounts Committee and the Committee on Public Service and Local Government. He is also a member of the NRM Parliamentary Caucus.

He's served on several school boards and was chairperson of finance on the boards of Seseme Girls Secondary School (2002 to 2012), Kisoro PTC (2004 to 2015), Kisoro Technical Institute (2004 to 2010), Kisoro Vision High School (2008 to date) and he was a member of the School Management Committee (SMC) for Seseme Primary School from 2008 to 2015. He is also the chairperson of Uganda Red Cross Society (URCS) Kisoro.

Personal life
Byibesho is married to Irene Ntakirutimana Byibesho, a primary school teacher, with whom he has two children. He is also the proprietor of Igiraneza Restaurant.

See also 
Kisoro District
National Resistance Movement
Parliament of Uganda
Kigezi

References

External links 
 Website of the Parliament of Uganda

Living people
1964 births
Members of the Parliament of Uganda
People from Kisoro District
People from Western Region, Uganda
Active politicians
Kyambogo University alumni
Uganda Martyrs University alumni
21st-century Ugandan politicians